The ornate soil-crevice skink (Notoscincus ornatus)  is a species of skink found in Australia.

Geographic range
The ornate soil-crevice skink (N. ornatus) is known to be found from the far north of Western Australia, the Northern Territory, Queensland, to South Australia. The subspecies N. ornatus wotjulum is found in the tropical north coast and hinterland, whereas the subspecies N. ornatus ornatus is generally not.

References

Notoscincus
Reptiles described in 1896
Taxa named by Robert Broom